The eleventh Minnesota Legislature first convened on January 5, 1869. The 11 members of the Minnesota Senate who represented odd-numbered districts were chosen in the General Election of November 5, 1867, while the 11 members of the Minnesota Senate who represented even-numbered districts, and the 47 members of the Minnesota House of Representatives, were chosen in the General Election of November 3, 1868.

Sessions 
The legislature met in a regular session from January 5, 1869 to March 5, 1869. There were no special sessions of the 11th Minnesota Legislature.

Party summary

Senate

House of Representatives

Leadership

Senate 
Lieutenant Governor
Thomas Henry Armstrong (R-High Forest)

House of Representatives 
Speaker of the House
Chester D. Davidson (R-Minneapolis)

Members

Senate

House of Representatives

Notes

References 

 Minnesota Legislators Past & Present - Session Search Results (Session 11, Senate)
 Minnesota Legislators Past & Present - Session Search Results (Session 11, House)
 Journal of the Senate of the Eleventh Session of the Legislature of the State of Minnesota
 Journal of the House of Representatives of the Eleventh Session of the Legislature of the State of Minnesota

11th
1860s in Minnesota